Iraqi–Lebanese relations have been close throughout history, both politically and culturally. Iraq and Lebanon have maintained diplomatic relations since 1943. Both countries have refused to recognize Israel and have recognized the State of Palestine.

Iraq, under the regime of Saddam Hussein, the leader of the Ba'ath Party, had strong relations with Bachir, and Amine Gemayel.

Lebanon's prime minister traveled to Baghdad in August 2008, which was the only third such visit by a top Arab leader since the U.S.-led invasion in 2003. Fuad Saniora called his one-day trip an opportunity to renew contact after more than a decade of chilly relations between Beirut and Baghdad. At a news conference alongside Saniora, Iraqi Prime Minister Nouri al-Maliki said the two countries would sign several agreements soon, including one on Iraq exporting oil to Lebanon.

Lebanon's majority leader, Saad Hariri visited Iraq in July 2008, followed by Jordan's King Abdullah II, the first Arab head of state to fly to Baghdad since the 2003 war.

Some figures in the Shiite political party and paramilitary group Hezbollah have close personal ties with the religious hierarchy in Najaf, and some Lebanese Shiites trace their family origins back to Iraq. Relations between Lebanon and Iraq soured in the mid-1990s after Iraqi agents killed a dissident in Beirut. But the two maintained embassies in each other's capitals even after the 2003 U.S.-led invasion of Iraq.

Both countries are members of the Arab League and the Group of 77.

In December 2021, Lebanon and Iraq signed a defense-related memorandum of understanding, related to developing bilateral military relations between the two countries.

See also
 Iraqis in Lebanon
 Foreign relations of Iraq
 Foreign relations of Lebanon

References

External links 
 Lebanese PM visits Baghdad to discuss Trade
 Iraqi government will provide Lebanon with oil at preferential rates

 
Bilateral relations of Lebanon
Lebanon